Giuseppe Biagi may refer to:

 Giuseppe Biagi (painter) (born 1949), Italian painter
 Giuseppe Biagi (explorer) (1897–1965), Italian soldier, explorer and radio operator